Barirah mawla Aisha was a 7th century Arab slave-girl who belonged to Utbah ibn Abu Lahab. She was forced to marry another slave whose name was Mughith, somebody she did not approve of. She had a child with him. Aisha took pity on her and bought her and set her free. When the young woman was free and in control of her own affairs, she divorced him. Mughith used to follow her, weeping, whilst she rejected him.

Sahih Bukhari quotes Ibn Abbas:

Muslims note here that when she asked if it was a commandment, obligatory to follow, Muhammad said that he simply was merely trying to intercede and bring about reconciliation if possible; he was not trying to force anybody to do something they did not wish to. See also Talaq.

References

External links 
https://web.archive.org/web/20050611082339/http://sisters.islamway.com/modules.php?name=News&file=article&sid=105

7th-century Arabs
Arabian slaves and freedmen